Teleiopsis lunariella is a moth of the family Gelechiidae. It is found on the Canary Islands.

The wingspan is 15–17 mm. The forewings are cinereous (ash-grey) to rosy reddish, sprinkled and suffused with tawny grey and black scaling. The hindwings are tawny grey with a rosy tinge.

The larvae feed on Rumex lunaria. They mine the leaves of their host plant. The mine has the form of a large, glassy blotch. All frass is ejected out of the mine. The blotch is located next to the leaf margin, which slightly curls over the mine. Larvae may also bore in young shoots. Pupation takes place outside of the mine.

References

Moths described in 1908
Teleiopsis